Tubbalubba Creek is a stream in the U.S. state of Mississippi.

The name "Tubbalubba" is either (sources vary) derived from the Choctaw language meaning "where the beans have been rooted up" or the Chickasaw language meaning "ravine tree, gully tree". Variant names are "Tucceluba Creek" and "Tuckalubba Creek".

References

Rivers of Mississippi
Rivers of Lee County, Mississippi
Rivers of Monroe County, Mississippi
Rivers of Pontotoc County, Mississippi
Mississippi placenames of Native American origin